Mel Jackson (born October 13, 1970) is an American actor. He is known for his roles in Living Single (1997–98), Soul Food (1997), The Temptations (1998), Deliver Us from Eva (2003), and Abduction of Jesse Bookman (2008).

Career
Jackson made his first big screen appearance in the 1997 film Soul Food, and since has appeared in films such as Deliver Us From Eva, The Temptations, Uninvited Guest, Motives, and Flip the Script. He played the role of Tripp on Living Single during the sitcom's final season.

Filmography

Film

Television

References

External links
 
 https://web.archive.org/web/20060813131540/http://www.meljacksononline.com/

1970 births
Living people
African-American male actors
American rhythm and blues musicians
Male actors from Chicago
Hyde Park Academy High School alumni
20th-century African-American male singers
21st-century African-American male singers